Robert John Rhawn (February 13, 1919 – June 8, 1984) was an American professional baseball player. Nicknamed "Rocky", Rhawn got into 90 MLB games during parts of those three seasons. He had an 11-year career overall (1938–1940; 1945–1952), most of it taking place at the highest levels of minor league baseball. He also served in the United States Army during World War II.

He made his MLB debut after the end of the 1947 minor league season—when he had batted .302 and knocked in 90 runs, and made the American Association's All-Star team as a utility player. In Rhawn's first big-league contest, he relieved Giants' second baseman Bill Rigney in mid-game, collected two singles in two at bats, and scored two runs in a 9–3 Giants' victory over the Chicago Cubs at Wrigley Field. Four days later, he went 3–for–4 against the Philadelphia Phillies, and hit the first of his two MLB home runs, a two-run shot off Schoolboy Rowe, pacing a 6–4 New York win.

He was traded along with Ray Poat from the Giants to the Pirates for Kirby Higbe on June 6, 1949.

Rhawn's 47 MLB hits also included nine doubles and two triples.

References

External links

1919 births
1984 deaths
Albany Cardinals players
Albany Travelers players
Asheville Tourists players
Baseball players from Pennsylvania
Charleston Senators players
Chicago White Sox players
Columbus Red Birds players
Los Angeles Angels (minor league) players
Major League Baseball third basemen
Minneapolis Millers (baseball) players
Montreal Royals players
Navegantes del Magallanes players
American expatriate baseball players in Venezuela
New York Giants (NL) players
Pittsburgh Pirates players
San Antonio Missions players
Toledo Mud Hens players
Toronto Maple Leafs (International League) players
United States Army personnel of World War II